Hugh Magnus MacLeod of MacLeod (born 1973) is the 30th Chief of Clan MacLeod and is currently representing the Associated Clan MacLeod Societies in the Standing Council of Scottish Chiefs. He is also recognized Chief of the Name and Arms of MacLeod, in Scotland and the United Kingdom, by the Court of the Lord Lyon.

Biography
Hugh was born in London in 1973. He graduated with a BA (Hons) in Film and Modern History from the University of London and the Sorbonne in 1995.

After a brief period at Sotheby's and Freud Communications, he began working in television as a researcher and was commissioned to direct and produce Champagne and Canvas, a documentary that was nominated for best video at the 1998 BBC British Short Film Festival. Since then, he has worked as a freelance director, producer, and writer in both film and TV, and also combines his media career with the management of the MacLeod Estate which he took on in 2008.

He divides his time between Dunvegan and London.

Ancestry

Heraldry

References

Alumni of the University of London
Hugh
Film directors from London
People from the Isle of Skye
English film producers
English people of Scottish descent
Anglo-Scots
1973 births
Living people